Lake George is a lake in  Chippewa County, Michigan, United States, and Algoma District, Northwestern Ontario, Canada, that lies between Sugar Island in Michigan on the west and the Ontario mainland on the east.

The lake is in the Great Lakes Basin and is part of Lake Huron and the St. Marys River. The primary inflow is the river arriving from Little Lake George at the north, and the primary outflow is the East Neebish Channel to the St. Joseph Channel at the south.

Tributaries
Clockwise from mouth
In Michigan
Rock Bottom Creek (right)
Wilmar Creek (right)
In Ontario
Bar River (left)
Echo River (left)

See also
List of lakes in Michigan
List of lakes in Ontario

References

Other map sources:

Lake Huron
Lakes of Algoma District
Bodies of water of Chippewa County, Michigan
Lakes of Michigan